Life-Line Hospital (LLH) is a private hospital in Damak of Jhapa, Nepal.

References

Jhapa District
Hospitals in Nepal